Eid al-Fitr or the Festival of Sweets is the earlier of the two official holidays celebrated within Islam (the other being Eid al-Adha). The religious holiday is celebrated by Muslims worldwide because it marks the end of the month-long dawn-to-sunset fasting of Ramadan. It falls on the first day of Shawwal in the Islamic calendar; this does not always fall on the same Gregorian day, as the start of any lunar Hijri month varies based on when the new moon is sighted by local religious authorities.  The holiday is known under various other names in different languages and countries around the world. The day is also called Lesser Eid, or simply Eid.

Eid al-Fitr has a particular  (Islamic prayer) that consists of two  (units) generally performed in an open field or large hall. It may only be performed in congregation and features seven additional  (raising of the hands to the ears while saying "Allāhu ʾAkbar", meaning "God is the greatest") in the Hanafi school of Sunni Islam: three at the start of the first  and three just before  in the second . Other Sunni schools usually have 12 , similarly split in groups of seven and five.

Native names

History 
According to Muslim tradition Eid al-Fitr was originated by the Islamic prophet Muhammad. According to certain traditions, these festivals were initiated in Medina after the migration of Muhammad from Mecca. Anas, a well-known companion of the Islamic prophet, narrated that, when Muhammad arrived in Medina, he found people celebrating two specific days in which they entertained themselves with recreation and merriment. At this, Muhammad remarked that God had fixed two days of festivity: Eid al-Fitr and Eid al-Adha.

General rituals 
Traditionally, Eid al-Fitr begins at sunset on the night of the first sighting of the crescent moon. If the moon is not observed immediately after the 29th day of the previous lunar month (either because clouds block its view or because the western sky is still too bright when the moon sets), then the holiday is celebrated the following day. Eid al-Fitr is celebrated for one to three days, depending on the country. It is forbidden to fast on the Day of Eid, and a specific prayer is nominated for this day. As an obligatory act of charity, money is paid to the poor and the needy before performing the ‘Eid prayer.

Eid prayer and  

The Eid prayer is performed by the congregation in an open area such as a field, community center, or mosque. The Eid prayer is followed by the sermon and then a supplication asking for God's forgiveness, mercy, peace and blessings for all living beings across the world. The sermon of Eid takes place after the Eid prayer, unlike Friday prayer which comes first before prayer. Some imams believe that listening to the sermon at Eid is optional. After the prayers, Muslims visit their relatives, friends, and acquaintances or hold large communal celebrations in homes, community centers, or rented halls.

Sunni procedure 
As ritual dictates, Sunnis praise God in a loud voice while going to the Eid prayer:

Recitation ceases when they get to the place of Eid or once the Imam commences activities.

This completes the first .

The congregation rises up and folds their hands for the second , after which the Imam recites  followed by another . The rest of the prayer is completed in the regular manner. This completes the Eid prayer.

Shia procedure 
The prayer starts with the  followed by five . During every  of the first , a special  is recited. After the prayer,  starts.

Post-prayer celebration

During the Eid celebration, Muslims greet each other by saying , which is Arabic for "Blessed Eid". As it comes after a month of fasting, sweet dishes and foods are often prepared and consumed during the celebration. Muslims typically decorate their homes, and are also encouraged to forgive each other and seek forgiveness. In countries with large Muslim populations, it is normally a public holiday with most schools and businesses closed for the day. Practices differ by country and region.

Practices and culture by country

West Asia

Arab States of the Persian Gulf 
In the United Arab Emirates and other Arab states of the Persian Gulf countries like Qatar, men would typically buy new  (traditional white long robe) or dye their existing  with walnut oil. Women would wear special clothes for the occasion along with special perfumes and braids. Most  would offer fruits, dates, tea or coffee to visitors. Those who live in rural areas tend to celebrate more modestly. Buildings, shops, roads and houses in UAE cities get decorated in bright festive lights. Many shows such as theatres would also occur.

Men typically wear  and women wear , the latter also painting Arabic henna tattoos on their hands or feet.

Saudis decorate their homes and prepare sumptuous meals for family and friends. They prepare new clothes and shoes for the festival. Eid festivities in Saudi Arabia may vary culturally depending on the region, but one common thread in all celebrations is generosity and hospitality. It is a common Saudi tradition for families to gather at the patriarchal home after the Eid prayers. Before the special Eid meal is served, young children will line up in front of each adult family member, who dispense money as gifts to the children.

In some places such as Ibri, folklore songs and traditional dancing are often performed.

Children gather in small choir groups in front of a home and sing. The song is intended to call on God to bless the youngest child of the family, to keep him or her healthy that the mother will remain happy. The more they sing, the more nuts and sweets they receive. The Qarqee'an tradition is intended to spread love, happiness and affection among adults and children Gargee'an.

In modern times, supermarkets, corporates, and malls compete to attract children during this time via advertising in newspapers and on TV, and by offering special promotions and arranging closed Qarqee'an events to market themselves.

Iran 

In Iran, at the last days of the month of Ramadan, several groups of experts representing the office of Ayatollah Khamenei go to the different zones of the country to determine the date of Eid al-Fitr. The Eid al-Fitr prayer, and the following sermon, has been led by Ayatollah Seyyed Ali Khamenei, Supreme Leader of Iran, at Tehran's Imam Khomeini Grand Prayer Grounds. The celebration is typically marked by a one- or two-day national holiday.

Turkey 

It is also customary for young children to go around their neighborhood, door to door, and wish everyone a "Happy ", for which they are awarded candy, chocolates, traditional sweets such as baklava and Turkish delight, or a small amount of money at every door.

Mosques, minarets and public fountains tend to be lighted up for the occasion, and popular events such as Sufi music concerts and dervish dancing ceremonies, Shadow Puppets show are held in the nights.

Palestine, Jordan, Syria, Lebanon

After the Eid al-Fitr prayer, the people of Jerusalem will decorate the courtyards of the Al-Aqsa Mosque with toys for children who come from all Palestinian areas to participate in the Eid al-Fitr prayer rituals. Many Palestinians go out to visit the families of those imprisoned, visit the prisons themselves, and visit the graves of the martyrs to lay wreaths on them.

A day before Eid, Al-Aqsa Mosque is decorated with Eid decorations, minarets chant with takbeer, and the old markets are filled with children and women carrying trays of cakes towards bakeries. 

Palestinians and Jordanians,
decorate their homes and prepare sumptuous meals for family and friends. They prepare new clothes and shoes for the festival. Eid festivities in Palestine and Jordan may vary culturally depending on the region, but one common thread in all celebrations is generosity and hospitality. It is a common 
Palestinian Jordanian tradition for families to gather at the patriarchal home after the Eid prayers. Before the special Eid meal is served, young children will line up in front of each adult family member, who dispense money as gifts to the children. Jordanians would also hang fanous lanterns.

In Lebanon, many concerts take place during Eid al-Fitr by Lebanese and other Arab superstars. Musicians also perform on the Beirut waterfront. Other activities include art exhibitions.

Ma'amoul and Kahk are popular cookie treats baked and consumed during Eid in Palestine, Jordan, Syria and Lebanon.

Iraq
In Iraq, kleicha (the traditional snack) and lamb are popular foods.

The Iraqi Kurds tend to visit cemeteries to remember their lost ones one day before the festival. After the prayers, Iraqi Kurdish families would gather together for large breakfasts of rice and stew, as well as candies, nuts and caffeinated beverages.

Yemen
In Yemen, Bint al-sahn is the preferred snack during Eid celebrations.

Africa

Egypt 

Egyptians spend the first day of Eid al-Fitr to gather all family members and celebrate the Eid at public gardens. Egyptians like to celebrate with others, so the streets are always crowded during the days and nights of Eid.

Nigeria
Eid is popularly known as Small Sallah in Nigeria. During the day, people generally greet each other by saying Barka Da Sallah, which when translated means "Greetings on Sallah" in the Hausa language
The celebrations last as long as 3 days
.

Tunisia 
Tunisia celebrates Eid for three days (with preparations starting several days earlier), two of which are national holidays. Special Sweets and biscuits, including Baklava and several kinds of "ka'ak", marzipan, cookies are made or buy to give to friends and relatives on the day. kids receive gifts from parents and elderly relatives, usually money or even toys. They also invite close friends and relatives for the Eid dinner. After Eid dinner people love to sing and dance.
In the city of Sfax, a special meal is consumed on the first day generally before noon, composed essentially of Chermoula and cured salted fish, typically  Bacalao.

Somalia 

In Somalia and other Islamic parts of the Horn region, Eid al-Fitr is observed by the Muslim communities. Celebrations marking the event are typically accompanied by elaborate banquets, where special dishes such as xalwo (halwo) and buskut (buskuit) are served.

Tanzania
Muslims in Tanzania celebrate Eid al-Fitr, when they normally dress in fine clothes and decorate their homes with lights. Special foods are prepared and shared with family and visitors, while children receive gifts. In Zanzibar it is popular for locals to buy new clothing, while women would shop for handbags, necklaces and other clothing. For some youngsters Eid nights involve dancing at a club. Children would receive coins of money from locals.

South Africa 

In Cape Town, hundreds of Muslims—each with something to share with others at the time of the breaking of the fast—gather at Green Point in the evening of the last day of Ramadan for the sighting of the moon. The Maghrib (sunset) prayer is then performed in congregation and the formal moon-sighting results are announced thereafter.

Morocco

Eid es-Seghir is the name of Eid al-Fitr among Moroccans. Many families have a tradition of buying new clothes for their children during the holiday. Common food choices for eid dinner include couscous, lamb or beef brochettes and others. In the north, musicians play Andalusian music accompanied by fast clapping.

Ethiopia
Eid is an important event for Muslims in Ethiopia, who form the largest Muslim community in East Africa.

Sudan 
In Sudan, where 97% of the population is Muslim, preparations for Eid begin the last few days of Ramadan. For days, ka'ak (sugar powdered cookies), bettifour (dry baked goods including dainty biscuits, baked meringues and macaroons—whose name are derived from the French petit four), and popcorn are baked in large batches to serve to guests and to give to family and friends; dressy Eid clothes are either shopped for or sewn; girls and women decorate their hands and feet with henna; and parts of the house may even be painted. The night before Eid, the whole household partakes in cleaning the house and yard and setting out the finest bedsheets, table cloths, and decorations. On the day of Eid, men and boys (and occasionally women and girls) will attend the Eid prayer. For the next 3 days, families will then visit each other, extended family, neighbors, and close friends. In these short visits, the baked goods, chocolates, and sweets are served, and often large lunches are prepared for the visiting well-wishers. Children are given gifts, either in the form of toys or money.

Senegal 

The holiday is widely called Korité in Senegal and elsewhere across West Africa. It is a national holiday, celebrated for three days, with families normally having new clothes made for the holiday. Gifts and donations are normally exchanged.

Ivory Coast
In the Ivory Coast, Eid is a large feast among Muslims. The celebration lasts between two and ten days depending on region.

Central Asia

Tajikistan
In Tajikistan the holiday is known as Idi Ramazon and is a national holiday.

Kyrgyzstan
In Kyrgyzstan the day is known as Orozo Ait. The local population celebrate in various ways such as by partying, eating and singing. Festivals often feature long distance horse racing and other horse-based sports. People would tend to wear fancy and bright clothes, while people would sing Jaramazan tunes and receive cooked bread, candy or cash in return.

Uzbekistan
Ramazon Hayit or Roʻza hayiti is a public holiday in Uzbekistan and widely celebrated. Traditional pastry such as kush-tili, plov and chak-chak are prepared by Uzbek families the day before Eid al-Fitr for consumption. Businesses tend to sell a high range of candies and children's toys during this period.

Kazakhstan
Known as Oraza Ait (Ораза айт) Kazakh Muslims tend to visit each other during the celebration and handing out fried doughnuts such as baursaki to others. However mutton, soup, tea and kymyz (horse milk) are also popular food and drinks during the holiday.

South Asia

Afghanistan 

In the predominantly Sunni Muslim culture of Afghanistan, Eid al-Fitr holds significant importance and is celebrated widely for three days. It popularly involves special festivities for children and the youngest members of families. The most common greeting is Kochnai Akhtar (Blessed Eid) in the Pashto-speaking community. Afghans start preparing for the Eid al-Fitr festival up to ten days prior by cleaning their homes (called Khana Takani in Dari). Afghans visit their local bazaars to buy new clothes, sweets, and snacks including Jalebi, Shor-Nakhod (made with chickpeas), Cake wa Kolcha (a simple cake, similar to pound cake). The traditional Bolani (vegetarian flatbreads) is a popular meal during Eid al-Fitr in Afghanistan.

On the day of Eid al-Fitr, Afghans will first offer their Eid prayers and then gather in their homes with their families, greeting one another by saying "Eid Mubarak" and usually adding "Eidet Mobarak Roza wa Namazet Qabool Dakhel Hajiha wa Ghaziha," which means "Happy Eid to you; may your fasting and prayers be accepted by God, and may you be counted among those who will go to the Hajj-pilgrimage." Family elders will give money and gifts to children. It is also common practice to visit families and friends, which may be difficult to do at other times of the year. Children walk from home to home saying "Khala Eidet Mubarak" ("aunt happy Eid"), and they receive cookies or Pala. Young girls and women apply henna “tattoo”s on their hands and feet. The older women while applying it too, don’t do very complicated designs. The boys and young men in some communities might apply it as well but, with very simple designs like a circle in their palms or just coloring the fingertips. The older men  might do those simple designs as well, but it is not that common. Henna is a “woman’s” thing in Afghanistan when it comes to doing designs on their hands and feet. At night, multiple campfires are set around houses, sometimes to the point that entire valleys may initially appear to be engulfed in flame. Celebratory fire with automatic rifles, particularly tracer rounds, can also be expected in high density.

India 

Eid is a public holiday in India. The holiday begins after the sighting of the new moon on Chand Raat. On that evening, people head to markets to finish their shopping for Eid, for clothing and gifts, and begin preparing their food for the next day. Traditional Eid food often includes biriyani, sheer khurma, and sivayyan, a dish of fine, toasted sweet vermicelli noodles with milk and dried fruit, among other regionally-specific dishes. Women and girls also put henna on each others' hands. In the following morning, Muslims go to their local mosque or Eidgah for Eid Namaz and give Eid zakat before returning home. Afterwards, children are given Eidi (cash gifts) and friends and relatives visit each others homes to eat and celebrate.

Pakistan 

People are supposed to give obligatory charity on behalf of each of their family members to the needy or poor before Eid day or, at most, before the Eid prayer, allowing for all to share in the joy of Eid. At home, family members enjoy a special Eid breakfast with various types of sweets and desserts, including Kheer and the traditional dessert Sheer Khurma, which is made of vermicelli, milk, butter, dry fruits, and dates. Eid is especially enjoyed by the kids, as they receive money in cash called "Eidi" as gift from their relatives and elders. People tend to get fresh and crisp banknotes to gift children with. State Bank of Pakistan issues fresh currency notes every year for this purpose.

Sri Lanka
Sri Lankan Muslims like to eat watalappam, falooda, samosa, gulab jamun, sheerkurma, oil cake and other national and regional dishes.

Bangladesh

The preparation for Eid in Bangladesh starts from the last quarter of the holy month of Ramadan. The markets and shopping malls become overwhelmed with people. Those who live away from their families for their job or livelihood, they return to their home towns and villages to celebrate the festival with family members and relatives. In the Chaand Raat children gather at the open field to see the Hilal (crescent moon) of the month of Shawwal. Girls decorate their hands with Mehndi. Like other South Asian countries, Lachcha semai (Vermicelli) are served with Roti or Paratha or Luchi as breakfast in Bangladesh. Then people attend the Eid prayer in Eidgah. Children do "Salam" by touching the feet of the elderly members of the family. And elders give them a small amount of money which is known as "Salami" or "Eidi (gift)", which is a major part of Eid happiness for children. Delicious dishes like Biryani, Polao, Pitha, Kabab, Korma, Payesh, Halwa etc. are served in the dining table. Wealthy Muslims in Bangladesh also distribute Zakat alms to the poor people. People visit the house of relatives, neighbour, and friends and greet each other saying "Eid Mubarak" (Happy Eid).

Nepal 
Eid is a national holiday in Nepal. Nepalese Muslims often consume the popular Nepalese dessert sewai (vermicelli pudding) to mark the occasion. It is commemorated throughout the country with large prayers, dinners and social celebrations.

Maldives
Celebration in the Maldives include cultural performances such as fire performances.

Southeast Asia

Indonesia 

Eid is known in Indonesia as Hari Raya Idul Fitri, or more popularly as Lebaran, and is a national holiday. People return to their home town or city (an exodus known as mudik) to celebrate with their families and to ask forgiveness from parents, in-laws, and other elders. Festivities start the night before with chanting the Takbir and lighting lamps. On the day itself, after Eid prayer in the morning, zakat alms for the poor are distributed in the mosques. People gather with family and neighbors in traditional clothing and have a special Lebaran meal. Children are given money in colourful envelopes. Later, it is common for Muslims in Indonesia to visit the graves of relatives to ritually clean the grave. Muslims also visit the living in a special ritual called Halal bi-Halal sometime during or several days after Idul Fitri.

Lebaran continues with drumming and street parades.

Malaysia, Singapore, Brunei

In Malaysia, Singapore, and Brunei, Eid is more commonly known as Hari Raya Aidilfitri (Jawi: هاري راي عيدالفطري), Hari Raya Idul Fitri, Hari Raya Puasa, Hari Raya Fitrah or Hari Lebaran. Hari Raya means 'Celebration Day'.

It is customary for workers in the city to return to their home town to celebrate with their families and to ask forgiveness from parents, in-laws, and other elders. This is known in Malaysia as balik kampung (homecoming).

The night before Hari Raya is filled with the sounds of takbir in the mosques or musallahs. In many parts of Malaysia, especially in the rural areas, pelita or panjut or lampu colok (as known by Malay-Singaporeans) (oil lamps, similar to tiki torches) are lit up and placed outside and around homes, while tiki torches themselves are also a popular decoration for that holiday. Special dishes like ketupat, rendang, lemang (a type of glutinous rice cooked in bamboo) and Malay delicacies such as various kuih-muih are served during this day. It is common to greet people with "Salam Aidilfitri" or "Selamat Hari Raya" which means "Happy Eid". Muslims also greet one another with "maaf zahir dan batin", which means "Forgive my physical and emotional (wrongdoings)".

It is customary for Muslim-Malaysians to wear a traditional cultural clothing on Hari Raya. The Malay variant (worn in Malaysia, Singapore, Brunei and Southern Thailand) is known as the Baju Melayu, shirt worn with a sarong known as kain samping or songket and a headwear known as songkok. Malaysian women's clothing is referred to as Baju Kurung and baju kebaya. It is a common practice however for the Malays in Singapore and Johor, Malaysia to refer to the baju kurung in reference to the type of outfit, worn by both men and women.

In Malaysia, especially in the major cities, people take turns to set aside a time for open house when they stay at home to receive and entertain neighbours, family and other visitors. It is common to see non-Muslims made welcome during Eid at these open houses. They also celebrate by lighting traditional bamboo cannon firecrackers known as meriam buluh, using kerosene in large hollow bamboo tubes or Chinese imported crackers. The traditional bamboo cannon, meriam buloh, and fireworks are notoriously loud and can be very dangerous to operator, bystander and even nearby buildings.

In Malaysia, children are given token sums of money, also known as "duit raya", from their parents or elders.

Thailand
There are almost 3 million Muslims in Thailand. In the southernmost provinces, wearing gold on Eid is a popular practice there along with neighbouring Myanmar. In some parts of the country, Muslim residences would open their homes with food specialities to visitors.

Cambodia, Vietnam
The Muslims of Cambodia often open their homes to friends and neighbours to share food together. Men, women and children dress in fine attire, while the preferred dress colour is white, symbolising the purity of the soul after a month of Ramadan. It is customary during Eid for Cambodian Muslims to donate 3 kilograms of rice to the poor or disabled.

Eid is also celebrated by the much smaller Muslim community of Vietnam, who are mostly of the same ethnic Cham people as in Cambodia.

Myanmar 
During Ramadan, in small towns and big villages with significant Muslim populations, Burmese Muslim youth organize singing teams called Jago (meaning "wake up"). Jago teams usually do not use musical instruments apart from the occasional use of harmonica mouth organs. The roving groups of singers will take the tunes of popular Hindi movie songs, replaced with Burmese lyrics and invocations about fasting, the principles of Islam, and the benefits of Salat.

Philippines
Among Muslim Filipinos in the Philippines, Eid al-Fitr is commonly known as Hariraya, Buka, Hariraya Buka, or Hariraya Buka Puasa. It is also known as Wakas ng Ramadan (literally "End of Ramadan"), Araw ng Raya ("Feast Day"), or Pagtatapos ng Pag-aayuno ("End of the Fast") in Filipino. It was proclaimed a legal holiday for Muslim Filipinos in 1977 by Presidential Decree 1083. In 2002, this was upgraded to a public national holiday by Republic Act 9177. It is also sometimes known by its Malay name "Hari Raya Puasa"; and by its Indonesian name "Lebaran".

Its beginning is decided by the sighting of the crescent moon (hilal), followed by morning prayers in mosques or public plazas. When this occurs can sometimes differ depending on the regional government. In some places it is based on the physical sighting of the hilal; while in others it is determined by the Regional Darul Ifta’ of Bangsamoro (RDI-BARMM) or the National Commission on Muslim Filipinos (NCMF), especially during cloudy days.

The sighting of the hilal is traditionally marked by the beating of drums in some regions. In modern times, this has evolved into a noise barrage known as "Mobile Takbir", where celebrants, especially youths, rev their motorcycles or honk their horns while driving through the streets. Guns are also sometimes fired. These practices have been discouraged by the Grand Mufti of Bangsamoro and local government officials as not being in accordance with Islamic teachings as well as being dangerous and causing accidents in the past.

Hariraya is characterized by the giving of gifts (known as Eidi), food sharing (salu-salo), and visiting the elderly and the sick. Food, alms, and basic necessities are also donated to the poor, a practice known as Fitrana or Zakat al-Fitr. This is usually done a day before Eid al-Fitr. Various traditional sweet delicacies of the different Muslim Filipino ethnic groups are served for breakfast, including daral, dodol, browas, tinagtag, panyalam, jampok, and so on. Various activities also mark the celebrations, including dancing, boat races, horse races, and carabao fighting in cities and towns with significant Muslim populations. In Metro Manila, the celebrations are usually held at the Manila Golden Mosque and the Quirino Grandstand. The celebration lasts for three days.

East Asia

China mainland

In mainland China, out of 56 officially recognized ethnic groups, Eid al-Fitr is celebrated by at least 10 ethnic groups that are predominantly Muslim. These groups are said to total 18 million according to official statistics, but some observers say the actual number may be much higher. It is also a public holiday in China in certain regions, including two Province Prefecture Level regions, Ningxia and Xinjiang. All residents in these areas, regardless of religion, are entitled to either a one-day or three-day official holiday. Outside the Muslim-majority regions, only Muslims are entitled to a one-day holiday. In Xinjiang province, Eid al-Fitr is even celebrated by the Han Chinese population. During the holiday, supplies of mutton, lamb and beef are distributed to households as part of a welfare program funded by government agencies, public and private institutions, and businesses. In Yunnan, Muslim populations are spread throughout the region. On Eid al-Fitr, however, some devotees may travel to Sayyid 'Ajjal's grave after their communal prayers. There, they will conduct readings from the Quran and clean the tomb, reminiscent of the historic annual Chinese Qingming festival, in which people go to their ancestors' graves, sweep and clean the area, and make food offerings. Finally the accomplishments of the Sayyid 'Ajall will be related in story form, concluded by a special prayer service to honour the hundreds of thousands of Muslims killed during the Panthay Rebellion, and the hundreds killed during the Cultural Revolution.

Taiwan

The Eid al-Fitr prayer and celebration in Taiwan draws much attention from local media. Special features of the event are regularly carried out in the newspapers and aired on televisions. These phenomena gives a boost to the Islamic activities in Taiwan. Muslims, mostly Indonesian blue collar men and women, typically gather at Taipei Main Station to perform the prayer.

Europe

Albania
Albanian Muslims generally celebrate the day as with most other countries. The day is known as Fitër Bajrami or Bajrami i Madh in Albania. Magiritsa (Greek Easter soup) is popularly consumed.

Bosnia and Herzegovina
In Bosnia and Herzegovina, Eid al-Fitr is locally known as Ramazanski bajram. It is a three-day public holiday. Worshipers attend a dawn prayer and a sermon, after which people visit each other, give gifts to children and popularly consume baklava.

Greece 
Eid al-Fitr (i.e. Seker Bayram, Sugar Feast) is celebrated in Greece mainly in the Western Thrace region from the local Muslim minority (Turks, Pomaks and Roma), along with the other two major celebrations, Kurban Bayram (Sacrifice Feast) and Hıdırellez. On the day of the Bayram, family gathers together, wear their best clothes, and celebrate with a common meal, after attending the morning prayer. The women prepare and offer sweets to family and visitors, while small children go around and pay their respects to the elderly by kissing their hands. The elder in turn reward them with candies, sweets, and small amounts of money. Local Muslim shopkeepers close their shops this day, while Muslim minority schools have a 5-day holiday for the feast.

Russia

Most festive dishes consist of mutton, but salads and various soups are also popular. As the Muslim population is diverse, traditional festive dishes differ between regions – for example in Tatarstan pancakes are popularly baked.

Russian Muslims go to festive worships at mosques in the morning of Eid al-Fitr, after which they often visit older relatives as a sign of respect. In the North Caucasian republics, children popularly go past various houses with a bag to get it filled with candy, specially stored by locals for the celebration. In Dagestan, eggs with bright stickers is a popular traditional dish served there during Eid al-Fitr. People generally dress more during this day – women choose bright dresses with beads while older people would wear papakhas. In many places in the country master classes are also hosted where families take part in activities such as embroidery and clay making.

Ukraine
In Ukraine, Eid al-Fitr as well as Eid al-Adha have been official state holidays since 2020. During the festival, Ukrainian Muslims (most of whom are Crimean Tatars) often gather with loved ones.

United Kingdom 
Although Eid al-Fitr is not a recognized public holiday in the United Kingdom, many schools, businesses, and organisations allow for at least a day's leave to be taken for religious celebrations.

Most of the masajid in the United kingdom hold special events after Eid prayer, including Islamic musical performances, brunch buffets, rides such bouncy castles and carousels.

New Eid tradition are born in internet era. As elsewhere, Muslims in the United Kingdom celebrate Eid by decorating houses, gift giving and Eid parties for kids.

Americas

United States 

In New York City, alternate side parking (street cleaning) regulations are suspended on Eid. Beginning in 2016, New York City public schools also remain closed on Eid. In Houston, Texas, the annual prayers are offered at the George R. Brown Convention Center in downtown Houston, organised by the Islamic Society of Greater Houston (ISGH). In other states, with smaller Muslim populations, it is common that schools will remain open on Eid al-Fitr.

The United States Postal Service (USPS) has issued several Eid postage stamps, across several years—starting in 2001—honoring "two of the most important festivals in the Islamic calendar: Eid al-Fitr and Eid al-Adha." Eid stamps were released in 2001–2002, 2006–2009, and 2011.

Most masaajid in the North America held special events after Eid prayer including Islamic musical performance, Brunch Buffets, rides such Bouncy, Carousel, Slide for kids.

New Eid traditions have been born in the Internet era. Some Muslim in North America now celebrating Eid with decorating houses, gift giving and Eid parties for kids.

Trinidad and Tobago
The Muslim population of Trinidad and Tobago popularly eat sawine/vermicelli, a sweet dessert, to mark the celebration, but the feast also consists of curries, rotis, and chicken and curry goat. Eid al-Fitr is a public holiday in Trinidad and Tobago.

Suriname, Guyana
Eid al-Fitr is a public holiday in Suriname and Guyana.

Argentina
In Argentina, Eid is officially a non-working holiday for Muslims.

In the Gregorian calendar 

Although the date of Eid al-Fitr is always the same in the Islamic calendar, the date in the Gregorian calendar falls approximately 11 days earlier each successive year, since the Islamic calendar is lunar and the Gregorian calendar is solar. Hence if the Eid falls in the first ten days of a Gregorian calendar year, there will be a second Eid in the last ten days of the same Gregorian calendar year, as happened in 2000 CE. The Gregorian date may vary between countries depending on the local visibility of the new moon. Some expatriate Muslim communities follow the dates as determined for their home country, while others follow the local dates of their country of residence.

The following table shows predicted dates and announced dates based on new moon sightings for Saudi Arabia.

Because the Hijri year differs by about 11 days from the AD year, Eid al Fitr can occur twice a year, in the year 1023, 1055, 1088, 1120, 1153, 1186, 1218, 1251, 1283, 1316, 1348, 1381, 1414, 1446, 1479, 1512, 1544, 1577, 1609, 1642, 1674, 1707, 1740, 1772, 1805, 1837, 1870, 1902, 1935, 1968, 2000, 2033, 2065, 2098, 2131, 2163, 2196, 2228, 2261 and 2293 (will continue to occur every 32 or 33 years).

Gallery

See also 

 Quds Day

References

Notes

Citations

Sources 
 Encyclopedia of Islam and the Muslim World. Edited by Martin, Richard C. Macmillan Reference, 2004. Vol. 1. 
 The Umm al-Qura calendar of Saudi Arabia (with computed and announced dates for Eid al-Fitr)

External links 

Fitr
Islamic terminology
Ramadan
Fasting in Islam
Shia days of remembrance
Public holidays in Algeria
Public holidays in Azerbaijan
Public holidays in Brunei
Public holidays in Indonesia
Public holidays in Malaysia
Public holidays in Singapore
Public holidays in Sri Lanka
Public holidays in India
Public holidays in Bangladesh
Public holidays in Pakistan
Public holidays in Turkey
Desserts
Sugar confectionery
Confectionery